This is a list of Norwegian government owned companies. In addition to this the government of Norway owns publicly traded stock domestically through Folketrygdfondet and internationally through The Government Pension Fund of Norway.

Wholly owned

Shared ownership

See also

 List of government-owned companies

References

Government enterprises
Norway e
Norway